Pam Dukes (born May 15, 1964) is an American athlete. She competed in the women's shot put at the 1992 Summer Olympics.

References

External links
 

1964 births
Living people
Athletes (track and field) at the 1987 Pan American Games
Athletes (track and field) at the 1991 Pan American Games
Athletes (track and field) at the 1992 Summer Olympics
American female shot putters
Olympic track and field athletes of the United States
Pan American Games track and field athletes for the United States
Place of birth missing (living people)
21st-century American women